Dipsas baliomelas is a non-venomous snake found in Colombia.

References

Dipsas
Snakes of South America
Endemic fauna of Colombia
Reptiles of Colombia
Reptiles described in 2008